Cussangy is a commune in the Aube department in north-central France. Its inhabitants are called cussangeois (male) and cussangeoises (female).

Population

See also
Communes of the Aube department

References

Communes of Aube
Aube communes articles needing translation from French Wikipedia